The first season of the Chinese reality talent show Sing! China premiered on 15 July 2016 on Zhejiang Television. The show is loosely based on a similar competition format in the Netherlands, The Voice of Holland. The show is hosted by Li Yong. Jay Chou, Na Ying, Wang Feng, and Harlem Yu are the coaches, same as the fourth season of The Voice of China

On 7 October 2016, Jiang Dunhao of Team Wang Feng was announced as the winner of the season, with Nathan Hartono of Team Jay as runner-up. Wang Chenrui of Team Na Ying, Xu Geyang of Team Wang Feng, Yang Meina of Team Harlem, and Jeryl Lee of Team Na Ying finished in third, fourth, fifth, and sixth place respectively. This is the first and only season to feature 6 finalists.

Coaches and hosts

Teams
 Colour key

Blind auditions
The taping of the blind auditions began on 19 June 2016.

 Colour key

Episode 1 (15 July)
The four coaches performed a medley of each other's songs – Na Ying performed Harlem Yu's "只有为你", Wang Feng performed Jay Chou's "安静", Yu performed Na's "不管有多苦", and Chou performed Wang's "满" – and concluded the performances with Chou's "我要夏天".

Episode 2 (22 July)

Episode 3 (29 July)
Da Shan, Tan Xuanyuan and Ika Zhao, artists from Team Harlem on the previous seasons of The Voice of China, performed "我要给你" at the start of the show to celebrate Yu's 55th birthday.

Episode 4 (5 August)
Host Li Yong performed a medley of songs by the four coaches – Wang's "春天里", Yu's "情非得已", Na's "征服", and Chou's "听妈妈的话" – at the start of the show.

Episode 5 (12 August)

The Fighting 
In this revamped version of the show, the Battle and Knockout rounds from The Voice franchise were combined and rebranded as the "Fighting rounds". The battling element from the Battle rounds – two artists paired together for a duet – did not return due to copyright concerns from show's producers. Only the concept from the Knockout rounds were kept and presented in the Fighting rounds – an artist performing a solo song against another artist from their own team, with their respective coach picking the winner among the two to advance to the Playoff rounds. The Fightings episodes were aired on 19, 26 August and 2, 9 September 2016.

The coaches' advisors for the season are Tanya Chua for Team Wang Feng, Fei Yu-ching for Team Jay, Mavis Fan for Team Harlem and Lang Lang for Team Na Ying. Occasionally, the advisors would provide recommendations to their respective team coach on who they should advance to the next round. However, the recommendations would not have an effect on the outcome of the results as the final decisions lie solely on the team coaches themselves.

 Colour key

The Playoffs & Live Show
The Playoffs began on 16 September and comprised episodes 11, 12, and 13, aired over three weeks. They were followed by the live show on the fourth week, the final phase of the competition.

From this point on in the competition, the remaining artists went head-to-head against artists from the other teams, which introduced the possibility of having a group of finalists without equal team representation.

Week 1–2: The Cross Fightings (16 & 23 September)
The first two weeks of the Playoff rounds featured coaches competing with an opposing coach with their remaining artists. Through the drawing of lots, it was decided that coach Na Ying would be given the opportunity to pick her opposing coach, and the remaining two coaches who were not picked by her would go head-to-head against each other in a separate episode. Na eventually picked Harlem Yu, and competed with him in the twelfth episode; while Team Jay competed with Team Wang Feng in the eleventh.

In a Cross Fighting, an artist would be sent by his or her coach to compete against an artist from the opposing team. The selection of the artists and their order of appearance were all decided by their respective coaches, and all of which were done without the knowledge of the opposing coach. Therefore, the pairings were completely by random, and would only be revealed when the coaches revealed their selection on stage. At the end of each Cross Fighting round, the artist receiving the most votes from the 51-person professional judging panel would advance to the next Playoff round. Each member of the judging panel was entitled to one vote per pairing.

Each of the coaches was allowed to save one losing artist from their respective team, and they had to decide on the spot if they would like to exercise the power on the artist once he or she was announced as the loser of a Cross Fighting. If the losing coach decides not to, the artist would be immediately eliminated. The two artists that were saved by the coaches (one from each team) would then perform again in the "coach's save" round, with the one receiving the most judges votes moving on to the Top 12. In the event when there was only one saved artist as the opposing coach failed to exercise his or her power, the only saved artist would be given walkover and automatically advance to the next round without having to perform again.

 Colour key

Week 3: Top 12 (30 September)
The Top 12 performed on the third week of the Playoffs for a spot in the finals. The order of appearance was decided through the drawing of lots by the coaches. In deciding who moves on, a professional judging panel made up of 51 veteran record producers, music critics, and media practitioners from various media companies; as well as the studio audience made up of 350 members of the public were given an equal say. Each of the voters was entitled to one vote per artist, and they can either choose to vote or not vote for a particular artist. The total number of votes cast by the professional judging panel and studio audience were converted into points accordingly to the weightage (50% each). The six artists with the highest accumulated total points would advance to the finals.

 Colour key

Week 4: Finals (7 October)
The Top 6 performed in the two-part season finale on 7 October 2016, held at the Beijing National Stadium. In the first round of the competition, the six finalists performed a duet or trio with their respective coach and a finalist from their team (if any), then a solo song. Based on the public votes received from the live audience at the end of the first round, the bottom four artists with the fewest votes were eliminated.

The final two artists then sang their winner's song in the second round of the competition, with the 81-person professional judging panel and live audience voting for the winner. Every member of the professional judging panel was entitled to one vote, and the total number of votes received by each artist were converted into percentage points based on the total voting strength, 81. Similarly, the public votes received from the live audience were also converted into percentage points based on the total number of the votes received by the final two artists. The artist who received the higher total average points was announced as the winner.

  Before the commencement of the solo performances in the first round, it was revealed Nathan Hartono 向洋 and Xu Geyang 徐歌阳 were leading in the number of public votes.
  Nathan Hartono 向洋 received 35,577 votes in the first round, and accumulated 45,613 votes by the end of second round. 
  Jiang Dunhao 蒋敦豪 received 39,962 votes in the first round, and accumulated 59,852 votes by the end of second round.
  Even though it was confirmed only 81 judges cast their votes, the total professional judging panel vote count added up to 92 instead of 81, due to a technical glitch. As the vote count was acknowledged on the show and the producers have yet to respond to the irregularity, the percentage points were converted based on the total vote count, 92, instead of the supposed 81.

Non-competition shows

The Mid-Autumn Special (15 September)

 Colour key

The National Day Special (3 October)

 Colour key

Elimination chart

Overall
Artist's info

Result details

Team
Artist's info

Result details

Reception

CSM52 ratings

Controversy and criticism
On the day of the finals, as voting by the media commenced to determine the winner, host Hua Shao had announced multiple times that the number of judges who were to cast their ballots was 81. The judges, said to be industry and media professionals, were invited on stage to drop their vote in two ballot boxes. The boxes scanned each vote cast and the vote count was updated 'live' on a large screen. As Hartono took the lead at first by nine votes, organisers decided to take a two-minute commercial break after detecting a computer glitch. Not too long after the show had recommenced, Jiang caught up, and both were neck to neck since. By the time the vote tally reached 81, Hartono appeared to be leading Jiang by five votes.

Had that been the case, Hartono would have stood a greater chance at being the first non-Chinese citizen to win the competition, and the first Singaporean to do so. However, the number of votes continued to increase, until eventually Jiang overtook Hartono with 47 votes to 45 – bringing the total number of votes to 92.  It had also been reported that Jiang's decisive 46th and 47th votes were made by the same voter – as was caught on camera.

Many viewers, especially supporters of Hartono, took to social media to voice their disapproval over the voting process. Among Singaporean fans, some speculated that the contest was rigged, while others simply congratulated Hartono for having come so far as a foreign participant. Hartono was the first Singaporean to have made it past the blind auditions, since all of Singapore's representatives for seasons 3 and 4 of The Voice of China – Jeremy Teng, Alfred Sim and Tay Kewei – had been unable to do so. He was also the first Singaporean to make it to the semi-finals and to the finals; his second-place finish was the highest a Singaporean (and any contestant who is not a citizen of China) has clinched in the competition so far.

In spite of this, Hartono's mentor Chou said in an interview with Sina.com after the competition that he was pleased with all aspects of the show, but joked that "the media were dizzy from the cold [weather], so maybe they voted wrongly." Hartono himself told Singaporean daily The Straits Times that he was not at all disappointed by the results. In a subsequent post on Facebook the next afternoon, he said, "Everybody has been asking me about my feelings towards the results. Well here they are: in short, I'm not bothered one bit. I couldn't have been happier to even be included in the finals. To then compete in the top two? That's just insane."

On the other hand, Jiang told Sina.com that he was just "dazed" after his win. He had expected either Hartono or Xu to be the champion, adding that there was "much he could learn" from Hartono. Asked whether the result was rigged because he has signed a contract with the producers, he said, "Yes, the company has given me a contract. To me, a boy from a Xinjiang border town, there was nothing shady. I had nothing. To get where I am today, besides my hard work, and my mentor's help, a large part was due to luck."

Alleged machine error

On 11 October 2016, four days after the grand finals, it was reported on The Straits Times that a machine error allegedly caused the mix-up.

While the producer of the show himself has not commented on the discrepancy, sources close to the show have blamed a machine error, and confirmed that there were indeed only 81 judges. "One swipe on the voting machine is one vote," claimed the source. "We didn't expect that when a swipe took a long time to be detected, the voting machine would read it again." The system did not limit one person to one vote and due to the glitch, 11 more votes were swiped in total.

The source also claimed that Jiang's "popularity with the audience" was key to his defeating Hartono.

References

2016 in Chinese music
2016 Chinese television seasons